Don Morton (born April 10, 1947) is a former American football player, coach, and software executive.  He served as the head football coach at North Dakota State University (1979–1984), the University of Tulsa (1985–1986), and the University of Wisconsin–Madison (1987–1989), compiling a career college football record of 76–51.  Morton's 1983 North Dakota State team won an NCAA Division II Football Championship.

Playing career and education
A native of Flint, Michigan, Morton played center at Augustana College in Rock Island, Illinois in the late 1960s and earned a Bachelor of Arts degree in psychology in 1969.  He later earned a Master of Arts degree in education and administration from Western Illinois University in 1974.

Coaching career
Morton began his professional career in 1969 as assistant football and head wrestling coach at Moline High School in Illinois, and served there through 1971. His successes at Moline High earned him his first collegiate position as offensive line coach and offensive coordinator at Augustana College in Sioux Falls, South Dakota from 1971 to 1976. He then moved on to North Dakota State University as offensive backfield coach from 1977 to 1978 and was named head coach there in 1979.

Nearing the end of his failed stint at Wisconsin, Morton, on his coaches' show, emerged from a coffin to declare that he wasn't dead yet.

Later years
A few years after his tenure as head football coach at Wisconsin, Morton returned to North Dakota State as the Assistant to the President and Director of University Relations.  He later joined Great Plains Software as chief of staff for CEO Doug Burgum.  Morton became an employee of Microsoft Corporation through the acquisition of Great Plains in 2001.  Morton was the site leader for the Microsoft campus in Fargo, North Dakota.
Morton is now retired from Microsoft.

Head coaching record

References

1947 births
Living people
Augustana (Illinois) Vikings football players
Augustana (South Dakota) Vikings football coaches
North Dakota State Bison football coaches
Tulsa Golden Hurricane football coaches
Wisconsin Badgers football coaches
Western Illinois University alumni
High school football coaches in Illinois
Players of American football from Flint, Michigan